The Mosler Red 82X is an experimental four cylinder, four stroke engine developed as a low cost replacement for older aircraft.

Design and development
A Red 82X was tested in April 1992 on a Luscombe 8A certified in the experimental-exhibition category.

Variants
Red 82X
Red 82DX
Dual ignition
Red 82LB
No ignition packaged

Specifications (Red 82X)

See also

References

1990s aircraft piston engines
Air-cooled aircraft piston engines